Eye & I is the debut album of Canadian rapper Kardinal Offishall, released independently in December 1997, on Capitol Hill Music, and distributed by St. Clair Entertainment. The album was critically acclaimed. One single, "On wit da Show", was released from the album.

Background
In 1996, after releasing his first single "Naughty Dread", Kardinal signed a publishing deal with Warner/Chappell Music Canada. About 40 percent of the album's cost was provided by the publishing deal. The only single released from the album was "On wit da Show", which was accompanied by a music video. The single also appeared on Kardinal's second studio album, Quest for Fire: Firestarter, Vol. 1. In 1998, a music video of the song "Jeevin' (Life)" was also released.

Members of The Circle appear on the album, including Solitair, Saukrates and Jully Black. Ro Dolla appears on the album as Afrolistics; Lock Jaw appears as L.J.

Reception
The album received rave reviews from music critics. AllMusic stated that Kardinal "blended soul, dancehall, reggae, hip-hop, and a wholly inventive approach to beats on his 20-track debut album, Eye & I." However, the album was poorly distributed in Canada, and a lack of radio support resulted in the album receiving limited commercial attention. Over 4,000 copies of the album were sold in its first three months of release.

Track listing
All songs produced by Kardinal Offishall, except "Sweet Marie" and "Jeevin (Life)", produced by Saukrates. "Breakdown (Keep Moving)" is co-produced by Saukrates.

Samples
"Bellee Buss (Don't Make Me Laugh)" contains samples of "Paid in Full (Coldcut Remix)" by Eric B. & Rakim and "Brainstorm" by Gang Starr

References

External links
Ready to reload - Kardinal Offishall drops his debut album

1997 debut albums
Albums produced by Kardinal Offishall
Albums produced by Saukrates
Kardinal Offishall albums